Steve Augeri (born January 30, 1959) is an American rock singer best known for his work as the lead singer of Journey from 1998 to 2006. He was also affiliated with Tall Stories and Tyketto. In 2014, he formed the band Ünderwörld, while also maintaining a solo career.

Personal life

Steve Augeri, the son of Joseph and Emma Augeri, was born on January 30, 1959, and raised in the Bensonhurst neighborhood of Brooklyn.

He attributes his love and of music and inspiration to his father, Joseph, and their many years of listening to Sinatra, R&B, soul, and country music on their Emerson clock radio. His grammar school music teacher, Fredrick Torregrossa, also had a direct influence by encouraging Augeri to develop and improve upon the potential of his voice and by casting him to sing Puccini's "La Donna Mobile" in the school's 4th grade musical.

Initially studying woodwinds at New York City's High School of Music and Art, Augeri switched to bassoon and soon discovered his love for classical music.

Attending, and then teaching at, French Woods Festival for the Performing Arts summer camp, he supervised children from ages 6–16 for their Rock Band classes.

Career
When Augeri's tuition check for college bounced, he returned home to start a rock and roll band. Working as a session vocalist, as well as bartending and waiting tables, it was not until 1984 when Augeri received his first break and was hired as background vocalist for Michael Schenker of UFO and Scorpions fame.

While in the market for a new guitar at Manny's Music on NYC's 48th St., Augeri met guitarist Jack Morer. Together they formed the critically acclaimed Epic Records recording and performing group "Tall Stories", along with Kevin Totoian on bass guitar, and Tom De Faria on drums. Tall Stories was nominated for “Best Debut Album”, and Augeri for “Best Debut Male Vocalist”, at the 1992 New York Music Awards.  The band held its last performance in Paris on New Year's Eve 1995.

Augeri soon forged a song-writing bond with Brooke St. James of Geffen's hard-melodic rock band Tyketto, which in turn led to an invitation to join the group as their lead vocalist. The album Shine was released in 1995, with a subsequent tour of Europe resulting in the album Take Out & Served Up Live in 1996.

He and Lydia Augeri (née Cirillo) had a son in 1996. Augeri decided to stay closer to home and return to his father's profession of carpentry by accepting a position with the GAP as a maintenance manager for their network of stores in New York City.

In 1997, just short of his one-year anniversary with the GAP, and after an introduction from guitarist Joe Cefalu, Augeri received a phone call from both Jonathan Cain and Neal Schon and was offered an audition to front the legendary rock band Journey.

In 1998, Augeri was officially named the group's new lead vocalist following the departure of Steve Perry. Augeri recorded three albums during a successful eight-year tenure with Journey. He toured with the band almost constantly during that period. The song "Remember Me", from the seven-times-platinum soundtrack album from the movie Armageddon, represents Augeri's recording debut with the band, followed by the album Arrival in 2001, and the EP Red 13, in 2002. The album Generations, released in 2005, would be his last studio album with the group, after his departure due to recurring vocal problems (from which he had been suffering since 2003) mid-tour in 2006. The live DVD of their Las Vegas concert recorded in December 2000, titled Journey 2001, acquired platinum status.

Augeri and his wife Lydia supported various charities with personal appearances and live performances, including Journey to the Cure (Breast Cancer Foundation), Little Baby Face Foundation, Diamond Angels (Joe DiMaggio Children's Hospital), and March of Dimes.

In 2010, he released the single "Riverside".  He released another single entitled "Photograph" in September 2011. A third single, "Hours In The Day", was released in September 2012. Two more singles - "For The Rest Of My Life" and "Behind The Sun" - were released in August 2013. "Home Again" was released January 2014.

In March 2014, it was announced Augeri had formed the supergroup Ünderwörld, alongside guitarist Kee Marcello (Easy Action, Europe), bassist Svante Henryson (Yngwie Malmsteen, Brazen Abbot) and drummer Virgil Donati (Southern Sons, Ring of Fire, Planet X, Soul SirkUS), however as of 2020 no recordings from the band have been officially released.

In March 2021, Steve Augeri, who fronts his own band, Steve Augeri Band, collaborated with Bad Penny, consisting of guitarist and songwriter Mike Holtzman, Danny Miranda (Queen + Paul Rodgers) on bass, and Jules Radino (Blue Öyster Cult) on drums. The first single released "Lose Yourself" was released shortly thereafter in March, followed up in December with an additional single "Don't Forget (This Christmas).

Discography

With Tall Stories
 Tall Stories (1991)
 Skyscraper (2009)

With Tyketto
 Shine (1995)
 Take Out and Served Up Live (1996)

With Journey
 Song "Remember Me", from the movie soundtrack Armageddon, 1998
  Arrival (2000)
 Red 13 (EP - 2002)
 Generations (2005)

With Steve Augeri Band
-Single Song Releases:
 Riverside (2010)
 Photograph (2011)
 Hours in the Day (2012)
 Rich Mans World (2012)
 Home This Christmas Time (2012)
 Behind the Sun (feat. Tom DeRossi) (2013)
 For the Rest of My Life (2013)
 Home Again (2014)
 Tin Soldier (2014)
 Faces (2014)
 In The Moment (2015)
 Riverside (Mississippi Mix) (2015)
 World Of Our Own (2017)
-Full Album Releases:
 Seven Ways 'Til Sunday (2022)

With Bad Penny
-Single Song Collaboration:
 Lose Myself (2021)
 Don't Forget (This Christmas) (2021)

References

Bibliography

External links
Official Website

American male singers
American rock singers
People from Bensonhurst, Brooklyn
Singers from New York City
1959 births
Living people
Journey (band) members
Musicians from Brooklyn